Timothy Frederick Lester (born February 8, 1977) is an American football coach who is the senior analyst for the Green Bay Packers of the National Football League (NFL). He most recently was the head football coach at Western Michigan University, a position he held from 2017 to 2022. Lester played quarterback at Western Michigan for coaches Al Molde and Gary Darnell from 1996 to 1999 and professionally for the Chicago Enforcers of the XFL in 2001. He then served as the head football coach at Saint Joseph's College in Rensselaer, Indiana in 2004 and at Elmhurst College from 2008 to 2012.

Early life
Lester attended Wheaton Warrenville South High School in Wheaton, Illinois. As a senior, Lester threw for 1,732 yards and 17 touchdowns (TDs) with two interceptions before succumbing to a knee injury in the playoffs. He was subsequently named second-team all-state by the Chicago Tribune. In two years as a starting quarterback, he completed 60 percent of his passes for 3,632 yards and 38 TDs with six interceptions.  Prior to his injury, Lester had been considered a blue chip prospect and planned on committing to Florida and head coach Steve Spurrier.

College career
Lester threw for 11,299 passing yards with 87 TDs during his career, setting 17 school records after being recruited to WMU and winning MAC Freshman of the Year under head coach Al Molde and subsequently Gary Darnell and offensive coordinator Bill Cubit. Lester finished his career ranked fourth all time in NCAA Division I for passing yards and sixth in touchdowns.

Following his senior season, Lester participated in the 1999 Blue-Gray Classic.

In 2011, Lester was named to the Western Michigan University Athletic Hall of Fame.

Professional career
Although Lester was scouted by several professional teams in college, he went undrafted in the 2000 NFL Draft.

Lester was drafted by the Chicago Enforcers in the sixth round of the 2001 XFL Draft. He played in four games, completing 40 of 76 passes for 554 yards with four touchdowns and five interceptions, and losing all four games as started; he was benched and eventually released midseason. 

Lester also spent time in the Arena Football League in 2001 with the Nashville Kats and Carolina Cobras; and the Arena Football League 2 in 2002 with the Memphis Xplorers.

Coaching career
Immediately following his playing career at WMU, Lester returned to his alma mater Wheaton Warrenville South high school as a math teacher. He also served as offensive coordinator for the varsity football team for one season. He continued to hold that job while playing for the XFL, effectively playing as a semi-professional.

Lester then spent one season as the head coach of NCAA Division II Saint Joseph's College in 2004. Following the season he was named the 2004 Independent Football Alliance (IFA) Coach of the Year.

Lester returned to WMU to serve as quarterbacks coach from 2005 to 2006.  The move reunited him with new Broncos head coach Bill Cubit. The two had previous success with Lester as quarterback and Cubit as offensive coordinator and quarterbacks coach from 1997 to 1999. Lester was instrumental in recruiting quarterback Tim Hiller, an All-MAC performer that surpassed several of Lester's previous school passing records. Lester voluntarily left his position following the 2006 season in order to find employment closer to his family in the Chicago area.  He found that at NCAA Division III North Central College, where he served as defensive coordinator for the 2007 season.

Elmhurst
In 2008, Lester was named the head coach of the Division III Elmhurst College Bluejays. In 2012 Lester was named the College Conference of Illinois and Wisconsin (CCIW) Coach of the Year after leading the Bluejays to their first NCAA Playoff appearance in school history. The conference championship was the first for the football program since 1980. The 2012, the Bluejays featured running back Scottie Williams, the Gagliardi Trophy award winner as the most outstanding player in Division III.

Syracuse
In 2013, Lester resigned from Elmhurst to accept an offer to be the quarterbacks coach and recruiting coordinator at Syracuse. The move reunited him with Orange head coach Scott Shafer and offensive coordinator George McDonald, all of whom had previously served on the same Western Michigan staff from 2005 to 2006.  On October 6, 2014, McDonald was demoted from offensive coordinator to wide receivers coach by Shafer. Lester was promoted from quarterbacks coach to offensive coordinator and play caller. He was let go after new athletics director Mark Coyle fired head coach Scott Shafer.

Purdue
On December 28, 2015, Purdue hired Lester to become its quarterbacks coach. Lester coached David Blough, and Purdue averaged 294.9 passing yards a game, ranking 21st in the country. He was not retained by incoming head coach Jeff Brohm.

Western Michigan
On January 13, 2017, Lester was hired as head coach at Western Michigan. Lester's base contract pays him $800,000 per year. Western Michigan fired Lester following the 2022 season, in which the team finished 5–7. In six seasons, Lester's teams compiled a 37–32 record.

Green Bay Packers
On March 10, 2023, Lester was hired by the Green Bay Packers as their senior analyst.

Head coaching record

References

External links
 Green Bay Packers bio
 Western Michigan profile
 Syracuse profile
 Chicago Enforcers profile

1977 births
Living people
American football quarterbacks
Carolina Cobras players
Chicago Enforcers players
Elmhurst Bluejays football coaches
Memphis Xplorers players
Nashville Kats players
North Central Cardinals football coaches
Purdue Boilermakers football coaches
Saint Joseph's Pumas football coaches
Syracuse Orange football coaches
Western Michigan Broncos football coaches
Western Michigan Broncos football players
High school football coaches in Illinois
High school football coaches in Tennessee
Sportspeople from Wheaton, Illinois
Coaches of American football from Illinois
Players of American football from Illinois